The Manyas shemaya (Alburnus carinatus)  is a species of cyprinid fish in the genus Alburnus. It is endemic to Lake Kuş (Manyas Lake) and Lake Uluabat and their tributaries in Turkey, both which are under environmental pressure from pollution and water abstraction. Sedimentation and the introduction of the invasive Prussian carp also impact this species. The IUCN has declared the Manyas shemaya as endangered.

References

Alburnus
Fish described in 1941
Endangered fish
Endemic fauna of Turkey